is a junction passenger railway station located in the city of Kusatsu, Shiga Prefecture, Japan, operated by West Japan Railway Company (JR West).

Lines

Station layout
The station consists of three island platforms serving two tracks each, connected by an elevated concourse, and two tracks without platforms. The station has a "Midori no Madoguchi" staffed ticket office.

Platforms

Adjacent stations

History
The station opened on 1 July 1889. With the privatization of Japanese National Railways (JNR) on 1 April 1987, the station came under the control of JR West.

Station numbering was introduced to the Tokaido Line in March 2018 with Kusatsu being assigned station number JR-A24.

Passenger statistics
In fiscal 2019, the station was used by an average of 29,569 passengers daily (boarding passengers only).

Surrounding area

East
 Kusatsu City Hall
 Kusatsu Police Station
 Kusatsu Tax Office
 LT 932, Garden City Kusatsu
 Kintetsu Department Store Kusatsu

West
 Hotel Boston Plaza Kusatsu

See also
 List of railway stations in Japan

References

External links

  

Railway stations in Japan opened in 1889
Tōkaidō Main Line
Railway stations in Shiga Prefecture
Stations of West Japan Railway Company
Kusatsu, Shiga